Michael Moore (January 9, 1941 – February 20, 2009) was a medicinal herbalist, author of several reference works on botanical medicine, and founder of the Southwest School of Botanical Medicine (SWSBM). Before he was an herbalist Michael Moore was a musician and a composer, father and husband.  He operated the SWSBM as a residency program for 28 years, first in Albuquerque, New Mexico, and later in Bisbee, Arizona.  For decades, Moore influenced, impacted, taught, and reached one way or another more practicing herbalists than any other living herbalist in the United States. His books put the previously unknown materia medica of the southwest into mainstream botanical field. 

While Moore believed herbs and plants provided a natural way of treating many afflictions, allopathic medications were to be used when required.

Resources revived by Moore
Michael Moore's web site is a major resource of historical material from the Eclectics and Physiomedicalists, of hundreds of plant images and data as well as SWSBM teaching materials. Moore was a major contributor in the revival of many historical texts of botanical medicine which had been lost to the general public. In 1990 Moore visited the Lloyd Library and Museum in Cincinnati, Ohio, where, in the basement, he found the accumulated libraries of all of the Eclectic medical schools, shipped off to the Eclectic Medical College as they closed. The material he published was from the Eclectics, Thomsonian medicalists and Physiomedicalists.

See also

 Eclectic medicine
 Herbalism
 Pharmacognosy
 Botany
 Ethnobotany

References

External links 
Tapes by Michael Moore
https://www.amazon.com/s?k=michael+moore+herbalist&i=stripbooks&crid=2D5BFFVCZTUOI&sprefix=Michael+Moore+herbalist%2Caps%2C232&ref=nb_sb_ss_c_2_23_ts-a-p

Herbalists
Ethnobiologists
1941 births
2009 deaths